Above and Beyond the Doll of Cutey is the debut studio album by American country music singer Pam Tillis. Released in 1983 as her only album for Warner Bros. Records, it features the singles "Killer Comfort" and "Love Is Sneakin' Up on You". The album was more pop oriented in comparison to her work on Arista Nashville.

Track listing
Side one
"Killer Comfort" (Pam Tillis, Pat Bunch, Pam Rose, Mary Ann Kennedy) – 2:45
"Love Is Sneakin' Up on You" (Pam Tillis, Pat Bunch, Doris Tillis) – 2:50
"Make It Feel Better" (Pam Tillis, Pat Bunch, Peter Wood) – 3:23
"Wish I Was in Love Tonight" (Pam Tillis, Peter Wood, Callie Khouri) – 3:16
"You Don't Miss" (Pam Tillis, Steve Goldstein) – 3:09

Side two
"Never Be the Same" (Pam Tillis, Fred Koller) – 4:01
"(You Just Want to Be) Weird" (Pam Tillis, Bill Lamb) – 2:30
"Popular Girl" (Pam Tillis, Mel Tillis Jr., Callie Khouri) – 2:16
"It Ain't Easy Bein' Easy" (Mark Gray, Shawna Harrington, Les Taylor) – 4:04
"Let's Get Crazy" (Pam Tillis, Peter Wood) – 3:32

Personnel
Adapted from Above and Beyond the Doll of Cutey liner notes.

Musicians
 Pam Tillis – vocals
 M. L. Benoit – percussion
 Doug Clement – vocals
 Chuck Findley – horns
 Bryan Garofalo – bass guitar
 Steve Goldstein – vocals
 Gary Grant – horns
 Jerry Hey – horns
 Jim Horn – horns
 Craig Krampf – drums, percussion
 Craig Hull – vocals, guitars
 Bill Lamb – vocals
 Josh Leo – guitars
 Daniel Moore – vocals
 Donna Rhodes – vocals
 Harry Stinson – vocals
 Wendy Waldman – vocals
 Peter Wood – keyboards

Technical
 Niko Bolas – engineer
 Dixie Gamble-Bowen – producer
 Steve Hall – mastering
 Jolly Hills Productions (Steve Goldstein, Craig Hull, Craig Krampf, Bryan Garofalo, Josh Leo) – producer
 Tim Kish – engineer
 Steve Tillisch – engineer
 Wayne "Duck" Tanouge – engineer

References

External links
 

1983 debut albums
Pam Tillis albums
Warner Records albums